The bibliography of the American novelist Thomas Pynchon ( 1937) includes both fiction and nonfiction works.

Fiction

Books

Short stories 
Six short stories by Pynchon were published in various magazines between 1959 and 1964. Five of his stories were republished in the 1984 collection Slow Learner.

Excerpts 
This section includes excerpts published prior to the excerpted work. It does not include excerpts reprinted after the publication of the excerpted work.

Juvenilia
Pynchon's juvenilia includes several short stories published in his high school student publication Purple and Gold, of which he was also an editor. As an undergraduate at Cornell University, he also co-wrote an unfinished, unpublished libretto for a dystopian musical with fellow student Kirkpatrick Sale.

Nonfiction

Technical writing for Boeing 

Between February 22, 1960 and to September 13, 1962, Pynchon was employed as a technical writer for the corporation Boeing, a major aerospace manufacturer and defense contractor. During that time, only one technical article with Pynchon's byline appeared in print: the feature "Togetherness" in Aerospace Safety, a periodical published by the US Air Force rather than Boeing. While "Togetherness" is the only technical article that can be attributed to Pynchon with absolute certainty, it is considered extremely unlikely that he would have produced only one article during more than two years on the job. As such, scholars have conducted research to identify articles that can plausibly be attributed to Pynchon.

Pynchon is known to have worked primarily as a staff writer for Boeing's Bomarc Service News, an in-house periodical related to development of the CIM-10 Bomarc surface-to-air missile. It remains possible, albeit uncertain and unlikely, that Pynchon contributed to other publications as part of his work at Boeing. Definitive attribution of any Bomarc Service News articles to Pynchon is impossible because the publication never used bylines. Nonetheless, at least two scholars have used textual analysis in an attempt to identify likely Pynchon pieces:

 In a 2000 article for Pynchon Notes, Adrian Wisnicki compiled a list of 24 "probable" and 10 "possible" examples of Pynchon's writing in Bomarc Service News based on stylistic and thematic similarities to known works. 
 In a 2019 article in the journal Textual Practice, Katie Muth used a stylometry-based authorship algorithm to identify eight Bomarc Service articles that were "closely correlated" with Pynchon's contemporaneous writing, as well as four that she determined were not correlated. Muth later claimed that, from the "handful" of Bomarc articles that could be reasonably attributed to Pynchon, two were "particularly" likely matches: "Torquing" (June 1960) and "The Mad Hatter and the Mercury Wetted Relays" (February 1962).

The following are Bomarc Service News articles assessed as potential Pynchon articles by Wisnicki, Muth, or both.

Correspondence

Misattributed and disputed works 
The following are written works for which there has been some claim or question of Pynchon's authorship. These were either works attributed to Pynchon upon publication—albeit dubiously—or works that attracted claims of being written by Pynchon under a pseudonym. None of these are generally accepted as authentic Pynchon writings, and in some cases the possibility of his authorship has been ruled out.

Notes

References

Citations

Sources

Bibliographies by writer
Bibliographies of American writers